The Chipmunks Rock the House is a music album by Alvin and the Chipmunks, released in 1991 by Quality Special Products.

Track listing

Side one 

 "Cradle of Love" (Billy Idol) - The Chipmunks
 "Freedom! '90" (George Michael) - The Chipmunks
 "Roam" (The B-52's) - The Chipettes
 "It Must Have Been Love" (Roxette) - The Chipettes
 "The Shoop Shoop Song (It's in His Kiss)" (Betty Everett/Cher) - The Chipettes
 "Express Yourself" (Madonna) - The Chipmunks and The Chipettes
 "Joyride" (Roxette) - The Chipmunks and The Chipettes

Side two
 "Rock the House" - The Chipmunks
 "U Can't Touch This" (MC Hammer) - The Chipmunks
 "Wiggle It" (2 in a Room) - The Chipmunks
 "Cold Hearted" (Paula Abdul) - The Chipettes
 "Unbelievable" (EMF) - The Chipmunks
 "Hangin' Tough" (New Kids on the Block) - The Chipmunks
 "Ice Ice Alvin"  (Vanilla Ice) - The Chipmunks

1991 albums
Alvin and the Chipmunks albums